Mike Bell (born 1984) is an English bridge player.

Bridge accomplishments
 EBU Player of the Year, 2017-2018

Wins

 English Bridge Union Schapiro Spring Foursomes (3) 2016, 2017, 2018 
 Mitchell Board-a-Match Teams (1) 2017

Runners-up

Personal life
Mike is married to Sarah Bell.

Notes

External links

1984 births
Living people
English contract bridge players
Place of birth missing (living people)